West Ravendale Priory was a Premonstratensian priory  in North East Lincolnshire, England. Its previous position is defined by earthworks and rubble. The ruins are Grade II listed, and lie within the civil parish of East Ravendale.

The priory was founded in 1202 by Alan, son of Count Henry of Brittany, as a cell of the Premonstratensian abbey of Beauport in Brittany. Owing to wars with France it was taken into the possession of the English Crown, and was part of the dowry of Joan of Navarre, wife of Henry IV. After her death in 1437 the priory was assigned to the collegiate church of Southwell. The remains of the chapel of the priory survived into the early 20th century.

In the Middle Ages, Lincolnshire was one of the most densely populated parts of England. Within the historical county there were no less than nine  Premonstratensian houses. Other than and West Ravendale Priory, these were: Barlings Abbey, Cammeringham Priory, Hagnaby Abbey, Newbo Abbey, Newsham Abbey, Orford Priory (women), Stixwould Priory and Tupholme Abbey.

References

Monasteries in Lincolnshire